Alikanas is a village in the municipal unit of Alykes situated on the northeastern coast about 15 km northwest of Zakynthos (city) on the island of Zakynthos, Greece.
Alikanas/Alykanas is a very well known tourist destination. People from all over the world are visiting Alikanas/Alykanas in the summer. It has a beautiful sandy wide beach On the beach of Alykanas you can find the lily of the sea, protected by Greek and International legislation. The famous caretta caretta might be seen sometimes in these waters, even though they prefer less populated areas.

Bay of Alykes, looking south, showing Alkes nearest with Alikanas beyond

Population

See also

List of settlements in Zakynthos

References

Populated places in Zakynthos